"Ynhanfu" is an organization, working in researching and promoting  traditional Chinese clothing Hanfu, which  was founded in Kunming, Yunnan Province, China in 2002. The goal of Ynhanfu is to promote Chinese traditional  clothing hanfu to the society. Ynhanfu only had eight members at the very beginning.

Development
Ynhanfu's initial concern was introduce Hanfu to the community of China and university students. Over the years, Ynhanfu has developed education, social welfare, Han Chinese clothing production, Festive celebrations and many other social undertakings. Strategies to recover Chinese traditional culture were also developed.

Cultural activities
Ynhanfu promotes Chinese culture, traditional clothing to the community, also held a lot of major Chinese traditional festivals celebrations in Kunming: the traditional Dragon Boat Festival, Tanabata Festival, and Mid-Autumn Festival. At the same time the traditional Chinese ritual activities: Worship of Confucius, weddings, mitzvahs and the beginning ceremony. And Yunnan also gives lectures of Chinese culture, Hanfu in many University.

Social welfare

Ynhanfu donations clothing  and medicines to children in China earthquake, also transports a large number of drinking water in arid regions, Funding student groups to do the traditional cultural activities.

Film shooting

Feb. 2010 Ynhanfu shot a historical drama "Seoul Xue Wang"。

References

Further reading 
 hanfu

External links
Ynhanfu

Trade associations based in China